Storhaug is a surname. Notable people with the surname include:

Åge Storhaug (1938–2012), Norwegian gymnast
Arne Storhaug (born 1950), Norwegian politician
Hans Storhaug (1915–1995), Norwegian resistance member
Hege Storhaug (born 1962), Norwegian journalist, author and political activist
Lars Storhaug (born 1935), Norwegian farmer and politician